The Sikorsky S-40 was an American amphibious flying boat built by Sikorsky in the early 1930s for Pan American Airways.

Design and development
Sikorsky designed the S-40 in response to a request from Juan Trippe, president of Pan American Airways, for a larger passenger-carrying airplane. The S-40 could carry 38 passengers, a significant increase over the S-38's eight passengers. Wind tunnel testing of the S-40 started in October 1928, and models of the hull were tested in April 1929. The aircraft featured a pantry with an electric refrigerator and stove as well as a smoking lounge with book-ended mahogany wood paneling. Six life rafts were carried.

Despite a significant size increase over the preceding S-38, the S-40 design was a conservative iteration of the smaller aircraft; the numerous flying wires and strut braces that were used in the exterior support framework caused significant drag and prompted Charles Lindbergh, retained as a consultant for Pan American, to tell Sikorsky "it would be like flying a forest through the air." Only three were built as Sikorsky began designing the more advanced and streamlined S-42 shortly after the S-40 entered service, based partly on input from Lindbergh. All three S-40s were built by the Vought-Sikorsky Aircraft Division of the United Aircraft in Stratford, Connecticut.

The first test flight occurred on August 6, 1931. The first aircraft was christened American Clipper by Lou Henry Hoover, wife of President Herbert Hoover, on October 12, 1931 at NAS Anacostia; after its christening, American Clipper flew around Washington, D.C.

In 1935, all three aircraft were upgraded and re-designated as the Sikorsky S-40A. Upgrades included replacing the original  Pratt & Whitney R-1860 Hornet B engines with smaller displacement but more powerful supercharged  R-1690 Hornet T2D1 engines, eliminating the landing gear, and increasing the maximum weight slightly. Another source states the landing gear was removed soon after the type certificate was issued.

Operational history
Passenger carrying service was initiated on November 19, 1931, with a S-40 piloted by Charles Lindbergh and Basil Rowe, flying from Miami, Florida to the Panama Canal Zone with stops at Cienfuegos, Cuba; Kingston, Jamaica, and Barranquilla, Colombia. Igor Sikorsky, the aircraft's designer, was on board as a passenger; during that trip, Sikorsky and Lindbergh began working on concepts that were used in the succeeding S-42.

The S-40 was Pan American's first large flying boat. American Clipper served as the flagship of Pan Am's clipper fleet and this aircraft model was the first to earn the popular designation of "Clipper" or "Pan Am Clipper". The three S-40s served without incident during their civilian lives, flying a total of over 10 million miles.

They were retired around 1940 and turned over to the US Navy during World War II, who used them as trainers for four-engined flight instruction. Under Navy service, the aircraft were designated Sikorsky RS-4. All three of the S-40s were eventually scrapped, starting in 1943.

Specifications (S-40)

See also

References

Notes

Bibliography

 "American airplane specifications". Aviation, Vol. 32, No. 1, January 1933, pp. 28–32. Registration required.
 Davies, R.E.G. Pan Am: An Airline and its Aircraft.  New York: Orion Books, 1987. .
 Yenne, Bill. Seaplanes & Flying Boats: A Timeless Collection from Aviation's Golden Age. New York: BCL Press, 2003. .

External links

 "World's Largest Amphibian Takes Flight", Popular Science, October 1931
 The Sikorsky S-40 in the film Flying Down to Rio
 "Huge Amphibian Will Carry Forty-Six Passengers" Popular Mechanics, July 1931 article and photos of construction of first S-40.
 "This Sea Going Airliner Is Like A Clipper Ship", Popular Mechanics, September 1931, early cutaway drawing on announcement of construction
 "Luxuries Found In Air Travel On Huge U.S. Planes", Popular Mechanics, July 1932, interior of S-40 showing passenger accommodations

S-040
1930s United States airliners
Flying boats
Amphibious aircraft
Twin-boom aircraft
Four-engined tractor aircraft
Parasol-wing aircraft
Pan Am
Aircraft first flown in 1931
Four-engined piston aircraft